Peenehagen is a municipality  in the Mecklenburgische Seenplatte district, in Mecklenburg-Vorpommern, Germany.  It was formed on 1 January 2012 by the merger of the former municipalities Groß Gievitz, Hinrichshagen and Lansen-Schönau.

Peenehagen has a population of 1,067 and covers a total area of 5,456.89 hectare.

References